The NASL Championship was the annual championship competition of the North American Soccer League (NASL), which formed the second division of American soccer from 2011 to 2017. The competition was held at the end of the regular season and was contested by the two finalists of the playoffs to determine the winner of the NASL Trophy, known as the Soccer Bowl Trophy. The tournament is named for the Soccer Bowl from the original incarnation of the NASL, which ran from 1967 to 1984.

The 2011 and 2012 titles were decided in a two-game aggregate finish. Since 2013 the championship has been a single-game final.  Beginning with the 2014 season, a new format was introduced, called the NASL Championship, with the final game being called the NASL Championship Final and only the trophy the Soccer Bowl trophy. The league suspended operations in 2018.

Format

In the league's first two seasons, the championship was played as a classic two-legged series. The league announced a switch for the 2013 season to a one-game championship final, also known as the Soccer Bowl.  In 2014 the format was tweaked again, and the game was renamed the NASL Championship Final, with the trophy being referred to as the Soccer Bowl Trophy.

Trophy

On October 22, 2011, the day their inaugural championship series got underway in Minnesota, the new NASL unveiled its championship trophy. The silver trophy has a large bowl etched with the NASL logo resting atop three long prongs, and the words "North American Soccer League Soccer Bowl" inscribed prominently across the base.

Results

See also 
 Soccer Bowl
 MLS Cup

References

External links
 North American Soccer League

 
North American Soccer League